The 2018–19 season is Rochdale's 112th year in existence and their fifth consecutive season in League One. Along with competing in League One, the club participated in the FA Cup, EFL Cup and EFL Trophy. The season covers the period from 1 July 2018 to 30 June 2019.

First-team squad

Statistics

|-
!colspan=14|Players who left the club during the season:

|}

Goals record

Disciplinary record

Contracts

Transfers

Transfers in

Transfers out

Loans in

Loans out

Competitions

Friendlies
On 17 May 2018, Rochdale scheduled a friendly away to Tranmere Rovers for the following July. A match with Stalybridge Celtic was announced a day later, prior to a match versus Stockport County being set on 21 May.

League One

League table

Results summary

Results by matchday

Matches
On 21 June 2018, the League One fixtures for the forthcoming season were announced.

FA Cup

The first round draw was made live on BBC by Dennis Wise and Dion Dublin on 22 October. The draw for the second round was made live on BBC and BT by Mark Schwarzer and Glenn Murray on 12 November.

EFL Cup

On 15 June 2018, the draw for the first round was made in Vietnam. The second round draw was made from the Stadium of Light on 16 August.

EFL Trophy
On 13 July 2018, the initial group stage draw bar the U21 invited clubs was announced. The draw for the second round was made live on Talksport by Leon Britton and Steve Claridge on 16 November. On 8 December, the third round draw was drawn by Alan McInally and Matt Le Tissier on Soccer Saturday.

References

Rochdale
Rochdale A.F.C. seasons